Vierbannen is a hamlet in the Dutch province of North Brabant. It is a part of the municipality of Altena, and lies about 11 km south of Gorinchem.

Vierbannen is not a statistical entity, and the postal authorities have placed it under Nieuwendijk. It consists of about 40 houses.

It was first mentioned in 1798 as Vierbanse Sluys, and is a settlement near a sluice with the same name. "ban(ne)" was an old name a piece of land. In this case four pieces of land.

References
 

Populated places in North Brabant
Geography of Altena, North Brabant